Huang Xin is a fictional character in Water Margin, one of the Four Great Classical Novels in Chinese literature. Nicknamed "Guardian of the Three Mountains", he ranks 38th among the 108 Stars of Destiny and second among the 72 Earthly Fiends.

Background
A military officer in Qingzhou (in present-day Shandong), Huang Xin fights with a sword called "Sword of Death". He acquires the nickname "Guardian of the Three Mountains" after he boasted that he could easily wipe out the bandits of the three mountains in the Qingzhou region: Mount Qingfeng, Mount Twin Dragons and Mount Peach Blossom.

Becoming an outlaw
Song Jiang, while sheltered by Hua Rong at Qingfeng Fort (清風寨; in present-day Qingzhou, Shandong) as he runs from the grave charge of killing his mistress Yan Poxi, is arrested and jailed by Liu Gao, the governor of the fort whose wife falsely accuses Song of abducting her with the bandits of Mount Qingfeng and nearly violating her. The fact, however, is that Song has prevented Wang Ying, one of the three bandit chieftains at Mount Qingfen who have befriended him, from raping her. Instead he has won her release as he is on the way to call on Hua Rong, who is the garrison commandant of Qingfeng Fort and a colleague of her husband.

Informed of Song Jiang's arrest, Hua Rong sends Liu Gao a letter to plead for his release. Rebuffed, Hua forces his way into the prison and saves Song. Intimidated by Hua's deadly archery skill, Liu reports the incident to Murong Yanda, the prefect of Qingzhou, whose jurisdiction covers Qingfeng Fort. Murong sends Huang Xin to Qingfeng Fort to settle the matter. Huang works out a plan with Liu whereby the former invites Hua Rong to a feast purportedly held to mediate the conflict. Hua turns up and is captured in the ambush. Liu's men have meanwhile seized Song Jiang as he sneaked to Mount Qingfeng.

While escorting the two prisoners back to Qingzhou, Huang Xin and his troops are intercepted by the three bandit chiefs of Mount Qingfeng. Outnumbered, Huang flees back to Qingfeng and puts himself behind barricades, leaving Liu Gao to be captured and killed.

Furious over the boldness of the bandits, Murong Yanda sends another officer Qin Ming, who has been a teacher of Huang Xin in martial arts, to lead troops to wipe them out. However, Qin is captured and by and by goes over to the side of Song Jiang.  Qin Ming then rides into Qingfeng Fort alone to persuade Huang Xin to defect too. Convinced, Huang Xin opens the fort's gates to the outlaws, who break in and take Liu Gao's wife back to the stronghold where she is killed by Yan Shun, the chief of Mount Qingfeng. As Qingzhou is likely to send a larger force, Song Jiang suggests the group decamp to join the bandits of Liangshan. Huang Xin thus becomes a member of Liangshan.

Campaigns
Huang Xin is appointed as one of the scouting generals of the Liangshan cavalry after the 108 Stars of Destiny came together in what is called the Grand Assembly. He participates in the campaigns against the Liao invaders and rebel forces in Song territory following amnesty by Emperor Huizong for Liangshan,

Huang Xin is one of the few heroes who survive all the campaigns. Reinstated as a military officer in Qingzhou, he returns to his previous post.

References
 
 
 
 
 
 
 

72 Earthly Fiends
Fictional characters from Shandong